Louis North was an American Negro league outfielder in the 1920s.

North played for the Richmond Giants and Baltimore Black Sox in 1922. In 25 recorded games, he posted 19 hits and nine RBI in 93 plate appearances.

References

External links
Baseball statistics and player information from Baseball-Reference Black Baseball Stats and Seamheads

Year of birth missing
Year of death missing
Place of birth missing
Place of death missing
Baltimore Black Sox players
Richmond Giants players